Jean Tholix (born 6 February 1984 in Toamasina) is a retired Malagasy footballer. A left back, Thoilix was a member of the Madagascar national football team.

References

1984 births
Living people
Malagasy footballers
Madagascar international footballers
People from Toamasina
Association football fullbacks
Ajesaia players
USJF Ravinala players
AS Adema players
La Passe FC players
Fosa Juniors FC players
Association football defenders
Malagasy expatriate footballers
Expatriate footballers in Seychelles
Malagasy expatriate sportspeople in Seychelles